Cuverville is the name or part of the name of several communes in Normandy, France:

 Cuverville, Calvados, in the Calvados département 
 Cuverville, Eure, in the Eure département
 Cuverville, Seine-Maritime, in the Seine-Maritime département, associated with André Gide
 Cuverville-sur-Yères, in the Seine-Maritime département

See also
 Louis-Hyacinte de Cavelier de Cuverville, French Navy officer
 Jules de Cuverville, French Navy officer
 Cuverville Island, Antarctic island named in honour of Jules de Cuverville